Discorsi, an Italian word meaning "discourses", may refer to:

Discourses on Livy (Discorsi sopra la prima deca di Tito Livio), a book by Machiavelli
Discourses and Mathematical Demonstrations Relating to Two New Sciences, a book by Galileo
I discorsi, an album by the Mina